Ann Arbor is a city in Washtenaw County, Michigan, US.

Ann Arbor may also refer to:

Ann Arbor station, an Amtrak station in Ann Arbor, Michigan
Ann Arbor Charter Township, Michigan, a township adjacent to the city of Ann Arbor
Ann Arbor Film Festival
Ann Arbor Municipal Airport (IATA: ARB, ICAO: KARB)

See also
Ann Arbor staging, the staging system for lymphomas
Anarbor, a pop-rock band on Hopeless Records
AnnArbor.com, Ann Arbor's defunct local newspaper
Ann Arbor Railroad (disambiguation) defunct lines in Ohio and Michigan
Ann Arbor (automobile), a vehicle produced by Huron River Manufacturing Company (1911–12)